Björksund Castle (Björksunds slott) is a castle-like manor house in Sweden. Björksund located on Sibbofjärden, northeast of Nyköping in Södermanland County, Sweden.

History
The Björksund estate first belonged to the Grip family, but came in the late Middle Ages through marriage to the Privy Councilor Göran Eriksson Gyllenstierna  (1498-1575) of Fågelvik. The estate remained in his family until 1776, when it partly  passed by purchase to Count Carl Gabriel Mörner (1737-1828), heir to the Privy Council member and  Marshal of the Realm Göran Gyllenstierna (1724–1799). 

The manor house was built in Baroque style during 1727. It was  designed by  French-Swedish architect  Joseph Gabriel Destain (died in 1740). Additions in the 1740s were by Baron Carl Hårleman (1700–1753).

Björksund Förvaltnings AB also manages a number of properties in Nyköping.

References

Sources

External links
Björksunds website

Castles in Södermanland County
Manor houses in Sweden